The 2016 United States House of Representatives elections in Ohio were held on November 8, 2016, to elect the 16 U.S. representatives from the state of Ohio, one from each of the state's 16 congressional districts. The elections coincided with the 2016 U.S. presidential election, as well as other elections to the House of Representatives, elections to the United States Senate and various state and local elections. The primaries were held on March 15.

District 1

The 1st district is based in Cincinnati, stretching southwestward to Ohio's borders with Kentucky and Indiana. It's been held by Republican Steve Chabot since 2011.

Republican primary

Candidates

Nominee
 Steve Chabot, incumbent U.S. Representative

Results

Democratic primary

Candidates

Nominee
 Michele Young, attorney and author

Eliminated in primary
 Jim Berns, Libertarian candidate in the 2010 and 2012 congressional elections
 Fred Kundrata, Air Force Veteran, Republican candidate for Ohio's 2nd congressional district in 2012 and nominee for this seat in 2014

Withdrawn
Samuel Ronan, maintenance technician

Results

General election

Endorsements

Results

Official campaign websites
Steve Chabot for Congress
Michele Young for Congress
Shalom Keller for Congress
Kiumars Kiani for Congress

District 2

The 2nd district takes eastern Cincinnati and its suburbs, including Norwood and Loveland, and stretches eastward along the Ohio River. It's been held by Republican Brad Wenstrup since 2013.

Republican primary

Candidates

Nominee
 Brad Wenstrup, incumbent U.S. Representative

Eliminated in primary
 Jim Lewis, member of the West Clermont Board of Education

Results

Democratic primary

Candidates

Nominee
 William R. Smith, truck driver, nominee for this seat in 2012 and candidate in 2014

Eliminated in primary
 Russ Hurley, small business owner, filmmaker, barber, US Navy veteran and Cannabis Activist
 Ronny Richards, Vietnam War Veteran and candidate for this seat in 2014

Results

General election

Results

Official campaign websites
Brad Wenstrup for Congress
Janet Everhard for Congress

District 3

The 3rd district, located entirely within the borders of Franklin County, taking in inner Columbus, Bexley, Whitehall, as well as Franklin County's share of Reynoldsburg. It's been held by Democrat Joyce Beatty since 2013.

Democratic primary

Candidates

Nominee
 Joyce Beatty, incumbent U.S. Representative

Results

Republican primary

Candidates

Nominee
 John Adams, manufacturing company owner, candidate for this seat in 2012 and nominee for this seat in 2014

Results

General election

Results

Official campaign websites
John Adams for Congress
Joyce Beatty for Congress

District 4

The 4th district, nicknamed the "duck district", sprawls from the Columbus exurbs, including Marion and Lima into north-central Ohio, taking in Oberlin. It has been held by Republican Jim Jordan since 2007.

Republican primary

Candidates

Nominee
 Jim Jordan, incumbent U.S. Representative

Results

Democratic primary

Candidates

Nominee
 Janet Garrett, retired teacher and nominee for this seat in 2014

Eliminated in primary
 Norbert G. Dennerll, Jr., former Cleveland city councilman and perennial candidate 
 Daniel Johnson

Results

General election

Results

Official campaign websites
Janet Garrett for Congress
Jim Jordan for Congress

District 5

The 5th district encompasses Northwestern Ohio, taking in Findlay, Defiance, and Bowling Green. It's been represented by Republican Bob Latta since 2007.

Republican primary

Candidates

Nominee
 Bob Latta, incumbent U.S. Representative

Results

Democratic primary

Candidates

Nominee
 James L. Neu, Jr. employee of Chrysler's Toledo machining plant

Results

General election

Results

Official campaign websites
Bob Latta for Congress
James Neu for Congress

District 6

The 6th district encompasses Appalachian Ohio, including Steubenville, Marietta, and Ironton. It's been represented by Bill Johnson since 2011.

Republican primary

Candidates

Nominee
 Bill Johnson, incumbent U.S. Representative

Results

Democratic primary

Candidates
 Michael L. Lorentz, mayor of Belpre

Withdrawn
 Michael D. Davenport

Results

General election

Results

Official campaign websites
Bill Johnson for Congress
Michael Lorentz for Congress

District 7

The 7th district is based in northeastern Ohio, and includes the city of Canton. It's been held by Republican Bob Gibbs since 2011.

Republican primary

Candidates

Nominee
 Bob Gibbs, incumbent U.S. Representative

Eliminated in primary
 Terry Robertson, truck driver and real estate agent

Results

Democratic primary

Candidates

Nominee
 Roy Rich, retired police commander

Withdrawn
 Bebley Thomas Spence, Jr.

Results

Independent Candidates
 Dan Phillip, local business owner

General election

Results

Official campaign websites
Bob Gibbs for Congress
Roy Rich for Congress 
Dan Phillip for Congress

District 8

The 8th district takes in the northern suburbs of Cincinnati, including Butler County, as well as taking in Springfield. It was held by Republican John Boehner until he announced that he would resign his seat effective October 30, 2015. A special election to fill the remainder of the term was held on June 7.

Prior to the announcement of Boehner's resignation, he was facing primary challenges from Tea Party activists and 2014 opponents businessman Matthew Ashworth and teacher J.D. Winteregg. Since Boehner's announcement, nearly 15 candidates pulled petitions for the Republican nomination.

Corey Foister won the Democratic nomination, but later withdrew from the election after the June 7th special election. Steven Fought was nominated by the Democratic Party to take Foister's place on the general election ballot.

Republican primary

Candidates

Nominee
 Warren Davidson, incumbent U.S. Representative

Eliminated in primary
 Matthew Ashworth
 Bill Beagle, state senator
 Tim Derickson, state representative
 Scott George, human resources executive
 Eric J. Haemmerle, high school government teacher
 Terri King, attorney
 Joseph Matvey
 Edward R. Meer
 John W. Robbins
 Michael Smith
 Jim Spurlino, businessman
 Kevin F. White, airline pilot and retired USAF officer
 J. D. Winteregg, former adjunct French instructor and candidate in 2014
 George Wooley

Withdrawn
 Eric Gurr, businessman and candidate in 2014
 Roger Reynolds, Butler County Auditor

Declined
 Bill Coley, state senator
 Joe Deters, Hamilton County Prosecutor and former Ohio State Treasurer
 Keith Faber, President of the Ohio Senate
 Richard K. Jones, Butler County Sheriff
 Wes Retherford, state representative
 Lee Wong, West Chester Township Trustee

Results

Democratic primary

Candidates

Nominee
 Corey Foister

Results

Replacement Nominee
 Steven Fought (D), former communications director and legislative director for U.S. Representative Marcy Kaptur

Green primary

Candidates
 James J. Condit Jr.

Results

Replacement Nominee
 Derrick James Hendricks (G)

General election

Results

Official campaign websites
 Warren Davidson for Congress
 Steven Fought for Congress

District 9

The 9th district spans the coast of Lake Erie from Toledo to the west side of Cleveland, taking in Port Clinton, Sandusky, Lorain, Lakewood, Brook Park, and Brooklyn. It's been held by Democrat Marcy Kaptur since 1983.

Democratic primary

Candidates

Nominee
 Marcy Kaptur, incumbent U.S. Representative

Results

Republican primary

Candidates

Nominee
 Donald P. Larson, small business owner

Eliminated in primary
 Steve Kraus, former State Representative
 Joel Lieske, political science professor at Cleveland State University

Results

General election

Results

Official campaign websites
 Marcy Kaptur for Congress
 Donald Larson for Congress 
 George Skalsky for Congress

District 10

The 10th district encompasses the Dayton metro area, including Dayton and the surrounding suburbs. It's been held by Republican Mike Turner since 2003.

Republican primary

Candidates

Nominee
 Mike Turner, incumbent U.S. Representative

Results

Democratic primary

Candidates

Nominee
 Robert Klepinger, nominee for this seat in 2014

Results

Independent Candidates
 Tom McMasters, mayor of Huber Heights, Ohio
 Dave Harlow (Write-in)

General election

Results

Official campaign websites
Robert Klepinger for Congress
Mike Turner for Congress
Tom McMasters for Congress
Dave Harlow for Congress

District 11

The 11th district takes in eastern Cleveland and its suburbs, including Euclid, Cleveland Heights, and Warrensville Heights, as well as stretching southward into Richfield and parts of Akron. It's been  held by Democrat Marcia Fudge since 2008.

Democratic primary

Candidates

Nominee
 Marcia Fudge, incumbent U.S. Representative

Results

Republican primary

Candidates

Nominee
 Beverly Goldstein, retired audiologist

Results

General election

Results

Official campaign websites
Marcia Fudge for Congress
Beverly Goldstein for Congress

District 12

he 12th district encompasses the northern Columbus metro area, taking in the northern Columbus suburbs, including Dublin, Westerville, Gahanna, and New Albany, as well as, Newark, Mansfield, and Zanesville. It's been held by Republican Pat Tiberi since 2001.

Republican primary

Candidates

Nominee
 Pat Tiberi, incumbent U.S. Representative

Results

Democratic primary

Candidates

Nominee
 Ed Albertson, businessman

Results

Green primary

Candidates

Nominee
 Joe Manchik

Results

General election

Candidates

Results

Official campaign websites
 Ed Albertson for Congress 
 Joe Manchik for Congress
 Pat Tiberi for Congress
 J. Baumeister for Congress

District 13

The 13th district covers the Mahoning Valley in northeastern Ohio, including Youngstown and eastern parts of Akron. It's been held by Democrat Tim Ryan since 2003.

Democratic primary

Candidates

Nominee
 Tim Ryan, incumbent U.S. Representative

Eliminated in primary
 John Stephen Luchansky, perennial candidate

Results

Republican primary

Candidates

Nominee
 Richard Morckel, technician

Results

General election

Results

Official campaign websites
Tim Ryan for Congress 
Richard Morckel for Congress

District 14

The 14th district is located in Northeast Ohio, taking in the eastern suburbs and exurbs of Cleveland, including Mayfield Heights, Solon, and Independence, as well as Ashtabula, Lake, and Geauga counties, northern Portage County, and northeastern Summit County. It's held by Republican David Joyce since 2013.

Republican primary

Candidates

Nominee
 David Joyce, incumbent U.S. Representative

Eliminated in primary
 Matt Lynch, former State Representative and candidate for this seat in 2014

Results

Democratic primary

Candidates

Nominee
 Michael Wager, attorney and nominee for this seat 2014

Eliminated in primary
 Alfred Mackey, former Ashtabula County Common Pleas Judge

Results

General election

Results

Official campaign websites
David Joyce for Congress
Michael Wager for Congress
Andrew Jarvi for Congress

District 15

The 15th district encompasses the southern Columbus metro area, taking in the western and eastern suburbs of Columbus, including Upper Arlington, Hilliard, and Grove City, as well as Athens. It's been held by Republican Steve Stivers since 2011.

Republican primary

Candidates

Nominee
 Steve Stivers, incumbent U.S. Representative

Results

Democratic primary

Candidates

Nominee
 Scott Wharton, farmer, airline pilot, candidate for this seat in 2012 and nominee for this seat in 2014

Results

Green primary

Candidates
 Dennis Lambert, nominee for the 6th District in 2014

Results

General election

Results

Official campaign websites
Steve Stivers for Congress
Scott Wharton for Congress

District 16

The 16th district takes in the western suburbs of Cleveland, including Westlake, Parma, and Strongsville, as well Medina, Norton, and North Canton. It's been held by Republican Jim Renacci since 2011.

Republican primary

Candidates

Nominee
 Jim Renacci, incumbent U.S. Representative

Results

Democratic primary

Candidates

Nominee
 Keith Mundy

Results

General election

Results

Official campaign websites
Keith Mundy for Congress
Jim Renacci for Congress

See also
 United States House of Representatives elections, 2016
 United States elections, 2016

References

Ohio
2016
United States House of Representatives